Townsend Letter, formerly Townsend Letter for Doctors, then Townsend Letter for Doctors & Patients, is a periodical focusing on alternative medicine which has been in circulation since 1983. 

The website Quackwatch has listed the Townsend Letter on its list of magazines as non-recommended and fundamentally flawed.

Abstracting and indexing 
Townsend Letter is abstracted and indexed by EBSCO Publishing, Gale, and the British Library.

References

External links 
 

Health publications
Alternative medicine publications
Publications established in 1983